is a town located in Mie Prefecture, Japan. , the town had an estimated population of 14,210 in 5730 households and a population density of 140 persons per km².

Geography
Taki is an inland municipality located in eastern Kii Peninsula in central Mie Prefecture.

Ponds - Gokatsura Pond, Tochi-ga-ike Pond
Rivers - Miya River, Kushida River, Sana River, Tokida River, Harai River

Neighboring municipalities
Mie Prefecture
Matsusaka
Ōdai
Meiwa
Tamaki
Watarai

Climate
Taki has a Humid subtropical climate (Köppen Cfa) characterized by warm summers and cool winters with light to no snowfall.  The average annual temperature in Taki is 14.9 °C. The average annual rainfall is 2015 mm with September as the wettest month. The temperatures are highest on average in August, at around 25.9 °C, and lowest in January, at around 4.2 °C.

Demographics
Per Japanese census data, the population of Taki has been declining slowly over the past 60 years.

History
The area of Take was part of ancient Ise Province. During the Edo period, it was mostly part of the holdings of Kii Domain. The village of Ōka (相可) was established on April 1, 1889 during the establishment of the modern municipalities system in the Meiji period. It was elevated to town status on June 20, 1919, and changed its name to Taki after merging of the neighboring villages of Sana and Tsuda, both in Taki District, on March 30, 1955. The village of Nishi-Tokida was annexed on April 15, 1959. On January 1, 2006 the village was merged into Taki.

Government
Taki has a mayor-council form of government with a directly elected mayor and a unicameral city council of 12 members. Taki, collectively with the other municipalities of Watari District, contributes two members to the Mie Prefectural Assembly. In terms of national politics, the town is part of Mie 4th district of the lower house of the Diet of Japan.

Economy
Taki serves as a commercial center for the surrounding region. The major industrial employer is Sharp Corporation. Noted agricultural products include Kaki persimmons and green tea.

Education
Taki has five public elementary schools and two public middle schools operated by the town government, and one public high school operated by the Mie Prefectural Board of Education.

Transportation

Railway
 JR Tōkai – Kisei Main Line
  -  - 
 JR Tōkai – Sangū Line
  -

Highway
 Ise Expressway
 Kisei Expressway

Local attractions 
Gokatsura Pond Furusato Village
Jingu-ji
Niu Jinja

Sister city relations
  Camas, Washington, USA

Notable people from Taki
Katsuhito Nakazato, photographer

References

External links

  

Towns in Mie Prefecture
Taki, Mie